Big Time is a 1929 American pre-Code film starring Lee Tracy and Mae Clarke as a show business couple who break up over his infidelity. This was Clarke's film debut. Director Kenneth Hawks was Howard Hawks' brother.

Cast
Lee Tracy as Eddie Burns
Mae Clarke as Lily Clark
Daphne Pollard as Sybil
Josephine Dunn as Gloria
Stepin Fetchit as Eli

Director John Ford had a cameo as himself.

References

External links

1929 drama films
American black-and-white films
Films about entertainers
Fox Film films
1920s English-language films
1920s American films